The year 2006 in art involves various significant events.

Events
Rembrandt 400 – Series of activities to commemorate the 400th anniversary of the birth of Rembrandt.
1 January – Resale Rights Directive in the European Union, providing a Droit de suite for artists, is implemented (in the United Kingdom by the Artist's Resale Right Regulations (February 13)).
1 July – Mudam museum of modern art in Luxembourg (city), designed by I. M. Pei, is opened by Grand Duke Jean. 
31 August – Stolen Edvard Munch paintings The Scream and Madonna are recovered in a police raid in Oslo, Norway.
17 November – The Metropolitan Borough of Bury in England sells its L. S. Lowry painting A River Bank (1947) (bought in 1951 for £150) for £1.25 million at a Christie's auction to a private buyer to help fund a £10 million budget deficit.

Awards
Archibald Prize – Marcus Wills, The Paul Juraszek Monolith
Artes Mundi Prize – Eija-Liisa Ahtila
Beck's Futures – Matt Stokes, Long After Tonight
Hugo Boss Prize – Tacita Dean
Caldecott Medal – Chris Raschka, The Hello, Goodbye Window
John Moores Painting Prize – Martin Greenland for "Before Vermeer's Clouds"
Turner Prize – Tomma Abts
Wynne prize – John Beard, The Gap

Films
Art School Confidential
Factory Girl
Goya's Ghosts
Klimt

Exhibitions
The Masterpieces Rijksmuseum, Amsterdam, 2 Jan – 31 December 2006
All the Rembrandts, Rijksmuseum, Amsterdam 26 Jan – 31 December 2006
Rembrandt – Caravaggio Van Gogh Museum in cooperation with the Rijksmuseum, 24 Feb – 18 June 2006
A summer with Rembrandt Mauritshuis, The Hague, 26 Jun – 18 September 2006
Rembrandt, the Etcher The Rembrandt House Museum, Amsterdam, 8 Jul – 3 September 2006
Rodin (Royal Academy of Arts, London, 23 September 2006 – 1 Jan 2007)
Everyone Sang: a view of Siegfried Sassoon and his world by 25 contemporary painters (Francis Kyle Gallery, London, November–December)
Peter Prendergast retrospective, Oriel Ynys Môn, 14 Jan – 26 February 2006 (toured throughout UK)
 "Barely Legal" (Banksy)

Works

 Magdalena Abakanowicz – Agora, Grant Park, Chicago, Illinois, United States
 Gary Breeze – Bali Bombings Memorial, London
 Ed Carpenter – Tecotosh (sculpture, Portland, Oregon)
 Brian Goldbloom – Festival Lanterns (sculpture, Portland, Oregon)
 Dan Graham – For Gordon Bunshaft (sculpture, Washington, D.C.)
 David Hockney
 Woldgate Woods, March 30 - April 21 2006
 Woldgate Woods, 6 & 9 November 2006
 Anish Kapoor – Cloud Gate aka "The Bean" (construction begun 2004 work finished 2006) at AT&T Plaza in Millennium Park in Chicago, Illinois
 Mel Katz – Daddy Long Legs (sculpture, Portland, Oregon)
 Gopal Swami Khetanchi
 Bani-Thani
 Devashree
 Frank Meisler – Kindertransport – The Arrival (sculpture, London)
 Asylum NYC
 Lovejoy Columns (sculpture, Portland, Oregon)
 Statue of James Meredith

Deaths

January to March
1 January – John Latham, Zambian conceptual artist (b.1921)
8 January – Mimmo Rotella, Italian artist and poet (b.1918)
14 January – Jim Gary, American sculptor (b.1939)
29 January – Nam June Paik, South Korean-born American video artist (b.1932)
15 February – Joash Woodrow, English artist (b.1927)
23 February – Mauri Favén, Finnish painter (b.1920)
4 March
David Rose, American animator (b.1910)
Edgar Valter, Estonian writer and illustrator of children's books (b.1929)
7 March - Mary Spencer Watson, English sculptor (b.1913)
9 March – Jean Leymarie, French art historian (b.1919)
25 March – Bob Carlos Clarke, Irish photographer (b.1950)
27 March – Ian Hamilton Finlay, Scottish poet, writer, artist and gardener (b.1925)
28 March – Pro Hart, Australian painter (b.1928)

April to June
5 April – Allan Kaprow, American painter, assemblagist and art theorist (b.1927)
15 April – Davidee Itulu, Inuit artist (b. 1929)
23 April – Isaac Witkin, South African sculptor (b.1936)
3 May – Karel Appel, Dutch painter, sculptor and poet (b.1921)
8 May – Iain Macmillan, Scottish photographer (b.1938)
9 May – Edouard Jaguer, French poet and art critic (b.1924)
27 May – Alex Toth, American comic book artist and cartoonist (b.1928)

July to December
8 July – Catherine Leroy, French photographer (b.1944)
15 July – Andrée Ruellan, American painter (b.1905)
28 July – Richard Mock, American painter, sculptor and cartoonist (b.1944)
1 August 
Jason Rhoades, American installation artist (b.1965)
Bob Thaves, American illustrator (b.1924)
4 August – Julio Galán, Mexican artist (b.1958)
20 August – Joe Rosenthal, American Pulitzer Prize-winning photographer (b.1911)
26 August – Vladimir Tretchikoff, Russian artist (b.1913)
1 September – Sir Kyffin Williams, Welsh landscape painter (b.1918)
17 October – Marcia Tucker, American museum curator (b.1940)
26 November – Dave Cockrum, American comic book artist (b.1943)
6 December – Robert Rosenblum, American art historian (b.1927)
16 December – Larry Zox, American painter and printmaker (b.1937)
18 December – Ruth Bernhard, American photographer (b.1905)

References

 
 
2000s in art
Years of the 21st century in art